Antonín Klimek (January 18, 1937 – January 9, 2005) was a Czech historian from Prague whose work focused mainly on the history of the First Czechoslovak Republic.

Books 
 1989 – Diplomacie na křižovatce Evropy
 1989 – Jak se dělal mír roku 1919
 1995 – Československá zahraniční politika 1918–1938 (together with Eduard Kubů)
 1995 – Vítěz, který prohrál, generál Radola Gajda (together with Petr Hofman)
 1996–1998 – Boj o Hrad I, II 
 1998 – Říjen 1918
 2001 – Velké dějiny zemí Koruny české - díl XIII. (1918–1929)
 2002 – Velké dějiny zemí Koruny české - díl XIV. (1929–1938)
 2003 – Vítejte v první republice, Havran,

External links
 Antonín Klimek, člověk nezávislý, bude chybět (in Czech)

20th-century Czech historians
1937 births
2005 deaths
Charles University alumni
Historians of Czechoslovakia